Bucket & Skinner's Epic Adventures is an American teen sitcom. The series aired on Nickelodeon from July 1, 2011 until June 9, 2012. The remaining episodes of the series were broadcast on TeenNick from December 22, 2012 to May 1, 2013.

Premise
The series follows two friends from the fictional California town of Pacific Bluffs. Often, the boys act quite impetuously leading them to multiple conflicts.

Characters

Main

Bucket (Taylor Gray) is a freshman in high school. He is Skinner's best friend. He spends his time surfing and trying to impress Kelly, his crush. His main competitor for Kelly's affections is Aloe. Aloe dislikes Bucket because he cut him off his board when he was five. He is Three Pieces's nephew. He is shown to be slightly smarter than Skinner and a bit more realistic.
Skinner (Dillon Lane) is Bucket's best friend and an avid surfer. He is not very bright and his desire for epic adventures often get the two of them into difficult situations. In the episode "Epic Musical" it is shown that he has a photographic memory, and in the episode "Epic Escape" it is shown that he is a very skilled ventriloquist.
Kelly (Ashley Argota) is a great surfer. She works part-time at a surf shop and is the object of Bucket's affections. However, she does not seem to notice. In the episode "Epic Jobs," she was working as a junior lifeguard with Aloe.
Piper (Tiffany Espensen) is Kelly's smart younger sister. She uses her wits to get what she wants by coming up with various sneaky plans. She has a crush on Skinner, but she hates Bucket for an unknown reason. She also helps Three Pieces with many of his problems.
John "Aloe" Aloysius (Glenn McCuen) is Bucket's arch-rival. He uses his money and popularity to embarrass Bucket and Skinner whenever he gets the chance. He is almost always accompanied by a student named Sven. He is very muscular, he has amazing pecs and abs. Aloe seems to like ribbon dancing as shown in "Epic Dancer". He is the captain of the varsity surf team. He has an 8-year-old brother, as mentioned in "Epic Girls". He also has feelings for Kelly.
Three Pieces (George Back) is Bucket's uncle and the owner of the local surf shop. He is a former surf champion and is always trying to impress the ladies. In the episode "Epic Dancer", it revealed that he got his nickname after his surfboard broke into three pieces while he was surfing a big wave. He is friends with all of Bucket's friends. In "Epic Musical," he shows himself to be a great singer.

Recurring
Sven (D.C. Cody) is Aloe's best friend. He is not very bright and possibly nicer than Aloe but does whatever he asks of him including embarrassing Bucket and Skinner.
Blake Dunkirk (Bryan Craig) is Kelly's boyfriend. He is a jock.

Broadcast

Bucket & Skinner's Epic Adventures premiered on Nickelodeon on July 1, 2011, with the show then going on a 5-month hiatus before being cancelled. The series was rolled out to the Canadian network, Nickelodeon (Canada) on September 10, 2011. Nickelodeon (Greece) started airing it on September 7, 2012. It was announced at the Children's Media Conference 2012 that Nickelodeon (UK and Ireland) will premiere the series on September 3, 2012. It was announced in late 2012 that Nickelodeon (Germany), Nickelodeon (France), Nickelodeon (Italy) and Nickelodeon (Latin America) will also be premiering the series in September 2012. It was announced that Bucket & Skinner's Epic Adventures would air in October 2012 on Nickelodeon Australia. These countries have shown episodes that have not aired in the United States until much later.

Cancellation
Ashley Argota reported on July 5, 2012, that Nickelodeon has cancelled the show with several episodes yet to air in the United States; however all episodes were broadcast in other countries, and by TeenNick in the United States from late-2012 through mid-2013.

Episodes

References

External links

2010s American teen sitcoms
2011 American television series debuts
2013 American television series endings
2010s Nickelodeon original programming
English-language television shows
Surfing mass media
Television series about teenagers
Television shows set in California
Television duos